Sorong Regency is a regency of Southwest Papua province of Indonesia. It covers an area of 13,075.28 km2, and had a population of 70,619 at the 2010 Census, and 118,679 at the 2020 Census; the official estimate as at mid 2021 was 121,963. Its administrative centre is the town of Aimas. Sorong Regency surrounds Sorong City (Kota) on the landward side; the city is administratively independent of the Regency; Sorong City has an airport, Sorong Airport, which also serves the Regency.

Geography
Sorong Regency is one of the regencies which is administratively included in the territory of the new Southwest Papua Province. Sorong Regency is located at 00° 33' 42” - 01° 35' 29" South Latitude and 130° 40' 49" - 132° 13' 48” East Longitude.

Administrative Districts
At the time of the 2010 Census, the Sorong Regency was divided into eighteen administrative districts (kecamatan). However, since 2013 Moraid District has been transferred to the expanded Tambrauw Regency, while thirteen additional districts have been created in Sorong Regency by the division of existing districts. Thus Sorong Regency now comprises thirty districts (kecamatan), tabulated below with their populations at the 2010 Census and at the 2020 census, together with the official estimates as at mid 2021.

The table also includes the location of the district administrative centres, the number of administrative villages (rural desa and urban kelurahan) in each district and its post code.

Notes: (a) the area and 2010 population of the new districts are included with the figures for the districts from which they were separated. (b) Salawati Selatan District and Salawati Tengah District are situated on the island of Salawati and are thus geographically part of the Raja Ampat island group. (Conversely, Salamati District and Salawati Timur District - the latter now called Moisegen district - do not lie on Salawati Island, but on the Papuan 'mainland'.) Note particularly that Raja Ampat Regency also contains a district on Salawati Island which is also named "Salawati Tengah".

Climate
Aimas, the seat of the regency has a tropical rainforest climate (Af) with heavy to very heavy rainfall year-round. Unlike most parts of Indonesia, it experiences a rainfall maximum during the low-sun season due to local wind currents.

References

External links
Statistics publications from Statistics Indonesia (BPS)

Regencies of Southwest Papua